Blacktown is an electoral district of the Legislative Assembly in the Australian state of New South Wales. The current member is 's Stephen Bali, who replaced former Labor leader John Robertson at a by-election in October 2017.

Blacktown is a 33.03 km² urban electorate in Sydney's outer west, taking in the suburbs of Blacktown, Doonside, Kings Park, Marayong, Woodcroft and parts of Bungarribee, Lalor Park, Quakers Hill and Seven Hills.

History

Blacktown is known as a largely working-class area, and as such, the electorate has tended to strongly support the Labor Party, which has held the seat for all but three years since its inception. It was briefly marginal during the late 1950s, when long-serving member John Freeman was forced into retirement after trying and failing to find a safer seat.  Alfred Dennis won the seat in the 1959 election, but held it for only one term before Labor regained it.

Since then, Labor's hold on the seat has only been seriously threatened once, when Labor suffered a swing of 18.7 percent amid its massive defeat in 2011. It is the only time since the 1950s that Labor has not won an outright majority of the primary vote in the seat.

Members for Blacktown

Election results

References

Electoral districts of New South Wales
1941 establishments in Australia
Constituencies established in 1941